Acres Green is an unincorporated community and a census-designated place (CDP) located in and governed by Douglas County, Colorado, United States. The CDP is a part of the Denver–Aurora–Lakewood, CO Metropolitan Statistical Area. The population of the Acres Green CDP was 3,007 at the 2010 United States Census.  The community lies in ZIP Code 80124.

History
The Acres Green subdivision was built by the Morris General contractors with construction beginning on a 
former pasture south of County Line Road near Interstate 25 in 1971
 
This was the first housing development in northern Douglas County.  
Construction on the sixth and final filling would be completed 12 years later.

The subdivision was being built up as Denver began to prosper with an economic boom because of the energy industry. By the time of the late 1970s, the subdivision contained a park, elementary school and library.

As Denver grew to the south along the I-25 corridor during this time, there was a need for additional housing.  
However, the area around the Acres Green community would remain largely isolated for many years.  
The nearest development was in southern Arapahoe County was over two miles (3 km) north of Acres Green until development extended south to County Line Road in the early-1980s.  The majority of Acres Green was complete before the Highlands Ranch community had even begun to the west around the same time.  Development of that community would not reach the area west Acres Green until the early-1990s.  The SH 470 highway was built between the homes of Acres Green and County Line Road in the mid-1980s.  The library, which was built in 1979 was leveled because it stood in the path of the highway.

In the mid-1990s, Denver began another economic boom because of the technology industry.  As the decade progressed, the long-time empty land around the Acres Green began to disappear.  The Meridian office complex was developed to the southeast.  Also, the Park Meadows shopping mall spurred large scale retail development all around the development.  Many other subdivisions were built to the south of Acres Green which became known as Lone Tree.

Today
Acres Green is now a well matured subdivision in a convenient location for those who work 
in the southeast part of Denver.    During 1995 the city of Lone Tree incorporated, nearly surrounding the community.  Homeowners voted against annexation and today still remain an unincorporated area of Douglas County.

Geography

Demographics

Education
The Douglas County School District serves Acres Green.

See also

Outline of Colorado
Index of Colorado-related articles
State of Colorado
Colorado cities and towns
Colorado census designated places
Colorado counties
Douglas County, Colorado
List of statistical areas in Colorado
Front Range Urban Corridor
North Central Colorado Urban Area
Denver-Aurora-Boulder, CO Combined Statistical Area
Denver-Aurora-Broomfield, CO Metropolitan Statistical Area

References

External links

Acres Green HOA
Douglas County website
Douglas County School District
Acres Green Elementary
Acres Green Cub Scout Pack 986

Census-designated places in Douglas County, Colorado
Census-designated places in Colorado
Denver metropolitan area